Detlef Okrent (October 26, 1909 – January 24, 1983) was a German field hockey player who competed in the 1936 Summer Olympics. He was also a member of the German NSDAP and SS.

He was a member of the German field hockey team, which won the silver medal. He played one match as back.

During World War II he became SS-Divisionsrichter within 2. SS-Panzer-Division 'Das Reich' in 1944. (NSDAP Nr.5038061; SS-Nr.120075)

External links
 
profile

1909 births
1983 deaths
German male field hockey players
Olympic field hockey players of Germany
Field hockey players at the 1936 Summer Olympics
Olympic silver medalists for Germany
Olympic medalists in field hockey
Waffen-SS personnel
SS personnel
Medalists at the 1936 Summer Olympics
20th-century German people